The 2020 Idaho Republican presidential primary took place on March 10, 2020. Six candidates filed to run in the presidential primary.

Results
Incumbent United States President Donald Trump was challenged by five candidates: businessman and perennial candidate Rocky De La Fuente of California, entrepreneur and investor Bob Ely of Massachusetts, entrepreneur and attorney Matthew Matern of Louisiana, former congressman Joe Walsh of Illinois, and former governor Bill Weld of Massachusetts. Walsh withdrew from the race prior to the primary.

See also
 2020 Idaho Democratic presidential primary

References

Idaho
2020 Idaho elections
Idaho Republican primary
Idaho Republican caucuses